Esa Antero Jokinen (born February 19, 1958 in Kuusankoski) is a retired male decathlete from Finland, who was nicknamed "Diesel" during his career. He set his personal best (7868 points) in 1980.

Achievements

References
sports-reference

1958 births
Living people
People from Kuusankoski
Finnish decathletes
Athletes (track and field) at the 1980 Summer Olympics
Olympic athletes of Finland
Sportspeople from Kymenlaakso